Klára Dobrev (born Klara Petrova Dobreva, ; on 2 February 1972) is a Hungarian left-wing politician who served as Vice-President of the European Parliament between July 2019 and January 2022.

Early life and education 
Dobrev was born in Sofia, Bulgaria to a Hungarian Jewish mother, Piroska Apró, and a Bulgarian father, Petar Dobrev. Her maternal grandfather, Antal Apró, a communist politician, served as Minister of Industry in the Hungarian People's Republic in the 1950s–60s.

Dobrev holds a degree in economics from the Budapest University of Economics, and a law degree from Faculty of Law of the Eötvös Loránd University. During her years at the University of Economics she was a member of AIESEC, and at the organization's 1992 world conference she was the animator board's vice president responsible for public relations. Dobrev spent her internship at Modi Xerox (now called Xerox India) as a marketing assistant in Bangalore, India.

Career 
Dobrev has held several government positions in the past, including Chief Cabinet to Péter Medgyessy during the 2002 parliamentary election, and vice-president of the Office for the National Development Plan and EU Support, where she served from 2002 until her husband's nomination for prime minister in 2004, when she resigned.

Dobrev is a senior lecturer at Eötvös Loránd University. She is chairperson of the Hungarian section of the UN Women. Dobrev became CEO of Altus Ltd. in 2009, a development consultant company, owned by her husband.

In 2019, Dobrev re-entered politics, as the lead candidate of the Democratic Coalition's European Parliament list for the 2019 election. With a stunning and surprising, 16.05% result for her party, better than all the surveys predicted, she was elected a Member of the European Parliament. Dobrev was elected a Vice-President of the European Parliament on 3 July 2019.

In October 2021, Dobrev stated that she was the frontrunner in the primary election of the coalition meant to run united against Viktor Orbán in the 2022 parliamentary election. Dobrev gained 34% of the votes in the first round in September 2021, running as the candidate of the Democratic Coalition and the Hungarian Liberal Party. In the second round held in October, she received 43% of the votes and was consequently defeated by Péter Márki-Zay of the Everybody's Hungary Movement, who gained 57%.

Other activities 
 European Council on Foreign Relations (ECFR), Member (since 2021)

Personal life 
Dobrev is married to Ferenc Gyurcsány, Prime Minister of Hungary between 2004 and 2009.

Recognition
She was recognized as one of the BBC's 100 women of 2013.

References

Sources 
 "A Glimpse into Hungary" (PDF) Ministry of Economy and Transport for the Republic of Hungary, August 2005, retrieved 23 November 2005.
 "Interview with Klára Dobrev" by András Lindner and Zoltán Horváth, 1 September 2005, retrieved 23 November 2005.
 Edit Kéri: Kik lőttek a Kossuth téren 56-ban? 

1972 births
Living people
Politicians from Sofia
Bulgarian emigrants to Hungary
Hungarian people of Bulgarian descent
Corvinus University of Budapest alumni
BBC 100 Women
21st-century Hungarian politicians
Academic staff of Eötvös Loránd University
21st-century Hungarian women politicians
Women MEPs for Hungary
MEPs for Hungary 2019–2024
Democratic Coalition (Hungary) MEPs